Ombudsman in Ukraine (Upovnovazhenyi/Upovnovazhena; literally plenipotentiary) is an office of commissioned representative who performs functions of ombudsman. Beside parliamentary ombudsman, there are several presidential commissioners.

List of ombudsmen in Ukraine
 Verkhovna Rada Human Rights Ombudsman, 1998
 Presidential Ombudsman of Children Rights, 2011
 Presidential Ombudsman in Crimean Tatars Affairs, 2014
 Presidential Ombudsman in Health Rehabilitation of participants of ATO, 2018
 Presidential Ombudsman of Handicapped People Rights
 Governmental Ombudsman in Education, 2017
 Business Ombudsman

Verkhovna Rada Human Rights Ombudsmen
 Nina Karpachova (1998–2012)
 Valeriya Lutkovska (2012–2017)
 Lyudmila Denisova (2018–2022)
  (2022–present)

Presidential Ombudsman in Health Rehabilitation of participants of ATO
 Vadym Svyrydenko

Presidential Ombudsmen in Children Rights
 Yuriy Pavlenko
 Mykola Kuleba

Presidential Ombudsman in Crimean Tatars Affairs
 Mustafa Dzhemilev

Governmental Ombudsman in Education
 appointment is anticipated in 2019

Business Ombudsman
 Algirdas Šemeta

References

External links
 Official website. Verkhovna Rada Human Rights Ombudsman.

 
Ukraine
Verkhovna Rada
Presidency of Ukraine